National Highway 128B, commonly referred to as NH 128B is a national highway in India. It is a secondary route of National Highway 28.  NH-128B runs in the state of Uttar Pradesh in India.

Route 
NH128B connects Azamgarh, Mau, Teekha and Phephna in the state of Uttar Pradesh.

Junctions  

  Terminal near Azamgarh.
  Terminal near Phephna.

See also 
 List of National Highways in India
 List of National Highways in India by state

References

External links 

 NH 128B on OpenStreetMap

National highways in India
National Highways in Uttar Pradesh